The 2016 NCAA Division II Football Championship Game was a postseason college football game that determined a national champion in NCAA Division II for the 2016 season. It was played at Children's Mercy Park in Kansas City, Kansas, on December 17, 2016, with kickoff at 4:00 p.m. EST (3:00 p.m. local CST), and television coverage on ESPN2.

Teams
The participants of the 2016 NCAA Division II Football Championship Game were the finalists of the 2016 Division II Playoffs, which began with four 7-team brackets to determine super region champions, who then qualified for the national semifinals. The game featured the winners of those national semifinal games: No. 3 seed North Alabama and No. 1 seed Northwest Missouri State. This was the third meeting between the two teams; entering the game, Northwest Missouri State led the series 2–0. This was the Bearcats' tenth championship game appearance, having won 5, while the Lions were making their fifth appearance, having won 3. Additionally, the Bearcats entered the game as the defending national champions and were seeking to extend their streak to having won 3 of the last 4 national titles.

National semifinals
Super region champions were seeded 1 to 4 for the national semifinals.

Game summary

Statistics

References

Championship Game
NCAA Division II Football Championship Games
North Alabama Lions football games
Northwest Missouri State Bearcats football games
American football in Kansas
NCAA Division II Football Championship Game
NCAA Division II Football Championship Game